Claim to Fame may refer to:
Claim to Fame (novel), 2009 novel by Margaret Peterson Haddix
Claim to Fame (TV series), 2022 American reality competition series